In Canada from 1993 to 2003 and again from 2007 to 2008, secretary of state was a title given to junior ministers of state in the Government of Canada that sat outside Cabinet. Because it was a position that was assigned to assist Cabinet ministers, a secretary of state was legally a minister of state; the distinction is that, unlike a minister, a secretary is not a full cabinet portfolio itself and thus not considered a member of Cabinet. (They were hence considered junior to ministers of state.) The Secretary of State (Training and Youth), for instance, would assist the Minister for Human Resources and Development. This usage is opposite to that in the United Kingdom, where junior ministers generally report to more senior secretaries of state. Secretaries of state were, however, members of the ministry and the Queen's Privy Council for Canada.

This generic usage should not be confused with the former cabinet positions of Secretary of State for Canada (1867–1996), Secretary of State for the Provinces (1867–1873), and Secretary of State for External Affairs (1909–1995).

History 
These positions were first used by Jean Chrétien as a way to decrease the size of the Cabinet without substantially decreasing the size of the ministry. When Paul Martin became Prime Minister in 2003, this usage ended, and he instead appointed ministers of state and increased the powers of parliamentary secretaries to act in junior policy positions.

Martin's successor, Stephen Harper, resumed the use of secretaries of state in a cabinet shuffle on 4 January 2007, but went back to ministers of state in his October 2008 cabinet.

List of Secretaries of State in Canada

External Affairs 
Between 1993 and 2003, there were at least three junior Minister of State positions within the Department of External Affairs (renamed in 1995 to the Department of Foreign Affairs and International Trade) responsible for assisting the Minister of Foreign Affairs (known until 1993 as the Secretary of State for External Affairs).

 the Secretary of State (Asia-Pacific) — relations within the Asia-Pacific
 the Secretary of State (Latin America and Africa) — relations with Latin America and Africa.
 the Secretary of State (Central and Eastern Europe and Middle East) — relations with Central & Eastern Europe and the Middle East (introduced by Order-in-Council in 2002).

Between 2007 and 2008, the Conservative Harper government included a less narrow position to assist with the Foreign Affairs minister, called the Secretary of State (Foreign Affairs and International Trade).

Heritage 
Several Secretaries of State assisted the Minister of Canadian Heritage (and antecedents) with the various portfolios of the Department of Canadian Heritage (formerly Department of Communications), including multiculturalism, which at one point fell under the Minister of Multiculturalism and Citizenship.

Industry 
The Secretary of State (Science, Research and Development) was a position introduced in 1993 to assist the Minister of Industry within Industry Canada.

The Secretary of State (Science, Research and Development) (Western Economic Diversification) was introduced in 1996 to provide assistance to the Minister of Western Economic Diversification within their department.

Under Prime Minister Stephen Harper, the office of Secretary of State (Small Business and Tourism) was introduced. On 2008 October 30, a ministerial position was established by Harper as the Minister of State (Science & Technology).

Labour 
The Secretary of State (Training and Youth) assisted the Minister of Labour for the Department of Labour until July 1996, when the labour ministry was abolished and  transferred to the Human Resources Development. In 1997, the secretarial position was changed to Secretary of State (Children and Youth).

Between 2007 and 2008 during the conservative Harper government, Human Resources Development included a Secretary of State (Seniors) to assist with the seniors portfolio.

Others

References 

Former Canadian ministers